Anshan modern Tall-e Malyan, was an Elamite and ancient Persian city.

It was one of the earliest urban states to exist, and one of the earliest capitals of Elam from the late 4th millennium BC. It fell under the rule of the Persians in the 7th century BC and then became one of the early capitals of Persia.

Most of what is known about Anshan has been discovered through ancient artifacts discovered in archaeological digs at Tall-e Malyan and passages in early Elamite texts.

History 
Anshan is considered to be the origin of one of the world's oldest known civilizations. It was occupied continuously from before 4000 BC to 1000 BC and was politically tied to the Elamites at Susa, as well as the Mesopotamians. Its exact location was unknown to scholars until 1973 when artifacts, uncovered through archaeological digs at Tall-i Malyan, confirmed its location. Prior to that scholars only knew of it to be somewhere in the central Zagros mountain range.

During the Proto-Elamite period (late fourth millennium BC), it became one of the main cities of the Elamite region, thanks to its location on important trade routes.

The Marv Dasht area, where the highland city of Anshan is located, is a complex of several interconnected valleys and plains. During the mid-late Banesh Period (3100-2800 BC) Anshan also had a walled area of 200 hectares. It also featured a number of subsidiary villages and campsites.

According to G. Wright:

The Elamite city makes an appearance in the early Sumerian epic Enmerkar and the Lord of Aratta as being en route between Uruk and the legendary Aratta, supposedly around the time writing was developed. At various times, Anshan provided, in its own right, the source for a number of Elamite dynasties that sometimes competed for extent and influence with other prominent Elamite cities.

The earliest evidence of Anshan can be found in the Sumerian King List where many references are made to rulers of Awan. Manishtushu claimed to have subjugated Anshan, but as the Akkadian empire weakened under his successors, the native governor of Susa, Kutik-Inshushinak, a scion of the Awan dynasty, proclaimed his independence from Akkad and captured Anshan. Following this, Gudea of Lagash claimed to have subjugated Anshan in 2200 BC and the Neo-Sumerian rulers Shulgi and Shu-Sin of Ur are said to have maintained their own governors over the place.  However their successor, Ibbi-Sin, seems to have spent his reign engaged in a losing struggle to maintain control over Anshan, ultimately resulting in the Elamite sack of Ur in 2004 BC, at which time the statue of Nanna, and Ibbi-Sin himself, were captured and removed to Anshan. In the Old Babylonian period, king Gungunum of Larsa dated his 5th regnal year after the destruction of Anshan.

During the early Elamite period, the rulers were known as the kings of Awan, but later on, they are referred to as the kings of Anzan, Susa, and Elam. There is also evidence that suggests Awan may have been a political district that was a part of a larger Anshan. Particularly since it has been discovered that Anshan was politically and culturally advanced. From the 15th century BC, Elamite rulers at Susa began using the title "King of Anshan and Susa" (in Akkadian texts, the toponyms are reversed, as "King of Susa and Anshan"), and it seems probable that Anshan and Susa were in fact unified for much of the "Middle Elamite period". The last king to claim this title was Shutruk-Nahhunte II (ca. 717-699 BC).

Cradle of Achaemenid Persia

Anshan fell under Persis Achaemenid rule in the 7th century BC, having been captured by Teispes (675–640 BC), who was an ancestor of Cyrus the Great and styled himself "the great king, king of Anshan". For another century during the period of Elamite decline, Anshan was a minor kingdom, until the Achaemenids in the 6th century BC embarked on a series of conquests from Anshan, which became the nucleus of the Persian Empire. The most famous conqueror who rose from Anshan was Cyrus the Great.

Evidence of the connection to the Achaemenid Empire can be linked through writings on the Cyrus Cylinder which trace the lineage of Cyrus the Great. Cyrus is referred to as the "king of the city of Anshan" and his ancestors as "the great king, king of the city of Anshan" 

Anshan continued to be inhabited through the Achaemenid period, but its importance declined greatly in favor of Pasargadae and Persepolis; it was merely a minor village by Parthian and Sasanian times.

Archaeology
The site of Anshan covers around 200 hectares. It dates back over 6,000 years and is considered a landmark in both an Elamite studies and Iranian architecture. The main feature is a low flat-topped mound of about 130 hectares running  in height. On three sides are the remains of a city wall,  in length, which dates from the Late Banesh and Kaftari periods. Finds at Tall-i Malyan included primarily Proto-Elamite and Middle Elamite cuneiform tablets, seals, and a pottery sequence important to dating the chronology of the region.

The site was first worked by Fereidoon Tavallali of the Archaeological Service of Iran in 1961. No records or publications of that effort appear to exist, though some artifacts ended up in the Persepolis Museum.

Scientific excavation began in 1971 with a team, led by William Sumner, from the University of Pennsylvania and Ohio State University after a survey in 1968. The dig continued for several seasons, until 1978, when the Iranian Revolution intervened. Most recently, Tal-i Malyan was excavated by Kamyar Abdi in 1999. A further six week dig was conducted in 2004 by the Cultural Heritage Organization of Iran and Dartmouth College.

The most notable find was that of a building brick found at an unspecified location in Iran in 1971. A photograph was discovered in a French archaeological publication which contained inscriptions from this brick that were key to identifying the lost city. These inscriptions were written in Elamite and believed to be part of a temple built by the Elamite kings to the gods at Anshan. After translating a group of tablets that were found at the Tall-i Maylan site the following fall, Erica Reiner, from the University of Chicago's Oriental Institute, was able to match these writings to those on the brick. They also matched the writings on tablets discovered by the Pennsylvania team which did, specifically, name Anshan. In 1973, it was confirmed that this site was the lost city of Anshan.

Three separate groups of tablets were found by the Pennsylvania team at the site. The oldest group contains seven tablets made of unbaked clay that date back to the third millennium BC. That set of tablets has not been translated because the writing is Proto-Elamite or possibly a script version of Elamite. The next set of tablets are inscribed in Sumerian and date back to 1800 BC. These tablets signify a Mesopotamian influence. The third set of tablets are the ones used by Erica Reiner to positively identify Anshan's location. An agreement was made between the researchers and the Iranian government that the Iranian government could choose ten artifacts and the remaining items would be divided between evenly between the two parties. The Iranian government chose to take several of the tablets in their choice of the original ten items.

See also
Prehistory of Iran
Cities of the Ancient Near East
Short chronology timeline
History of Iran
Cyrus the Great
List of kings of Persia
List of rulers of Elam

References

Sources
 
Ilene M. Nicholas, The Proto-Elamite Settlement at Tuv, Malyan Excavation Reports Volume 1, University of Pennsylvania Museum Publication, 1991, 
Elizabeth Carter and Ken Deaver, Excavations at Anshan (Tal-E Malyan): The Middle Elamite Period, Malyan Excavation Reports Volume 2, University of Pennsylvania Museum Publication, 1996, 
William M. Sumner, Malyan Excavation Reports III: Early Urban Life in the Land of Anshan, Excavations at Tal-e Malyan in the Highlands of IranUniversity of Pennsylvania Museum of Archaeology and Anthropology, Monograph 117, 2003, 
The Archaeology of Elam: Formation and Transformation of an Ancient Iranian State by D. T. Potts, Cambridge University Press, 1999, 
Matthew W. Stolper, Texts from Tall-i Malyan Vol. 1: Elamite Administrative Texts (1972–74), University of Pennsylvania Museum Publication, 1984, 
William M. Sumner, Tall-i-Malyan and the Chronology of the Kur River Basin, American Journal of Archaeology, vol. 77, no. 3, pp. 288–290, 1973
William M. Sumner, Malyan Excavation Reports III: Early Urban Life in the Land of Anshan, Excavations at Tal-e Malyan in the Highlands of Iran, 2003
F. Desset, An Architectural Pattern in Late Fourth-Millennium BC Western Iran: A New Link Between Susa, Tal-I Malyan, and Godin Tepe, Iran, Journal of the British Institute of Persian Studies, vol. 52, iss. 1, 2014

External links
"Anshan", Encyclopædia Iranica
Digital Images of Tall-i Malyan tablets at CDLI
Year Names of Shulgi at CDLI (note years 30, 34, 35 and 36)
Year Names of Gungunum at CDLI
Penn Museum excavation

Populated places established in the 6th millennium BC
1961 archaeological discoveries
Elamite cities
Former populated places in Iran
Archaeological sites in Iran
Geography of Fars Province
Former kingdoms